Second Time Around or The Second Time Around may refer to:

Film 
 The Second Time Around (1961 film), an American Western comedy starring Debbie Reynolds
 Second Time Around (film), a 2002 Hong Kong film
 The Second Time Around (2016 film), a Canadian romance film

Television 
 Second Time Around (TV series), a 2004–2005 American sitcom
 "Second Time Around" (Cheers), a 1986 episode
 "Second Time Around" (Inspector Morse), a 1991 episode
 "Second Time Around" (Roseanne), a 1991 episode
 "The Second Time Around" (Flipper), a 1964 episode
 "The Second Time Around" (Minder), a 1984 episode
 "The Second Time Around" (Only Fools and Horses), a 1981 episode
 "Second Time Around", the first episode of the 2021 Rugrats reboot

Music

Albums 
 Second Time Around (Ghost album), 1992
 The Second Time Around (Etta James album), 1961
 2nd Time Around (album), by the Spinners, 1970
 Second Time Around, by the Kinks, 1980
 Second Time Around, by Mike Tramp, 2020

Songs 
 "The Second Time Around" (1960 song), written by Sammy Cahn and Jimmy Van Heusen
 "The Second Time Around" (Shalamar song), 1979
 "Second Time Around", by the Damned from Machine Gun Etiquette, 1979
 "Second Time Around", by the Electric Light Orchestra from Discovery, 2001 reissue
 "Second Time Around", by the Mighty Lemon Drops from Laughter, 1989
 "Second Time Around", by the Posies from Every Kind of Light, 2005
 "Second Time Around", by Yo-Yo Ma, Mark O'Connor, and Edgar Meyer from Appalachian Journey, 2000
 "Second Time Around", the theme song of the sitcom Step by Step, 1991